Kurtköy can refer to the following villages in Turkey:

 Kurtköy, Bilecik
 Kurtköy, Devrekani
 Kurtköy, Pendik
 Kurtköy, Zonguldak

See also
 Kurtköy High School